Juan Jose Giha Ali (23 October 1922 – 1999) was a Peruvian sports shooter. He competed in the trap event at the 1972 Summer Olympics.

References

External links
 

1922 births
1999 deaths
Peruvian male sport shooters
Olympic shooters of Peru
Shooters at the 1972 Summer Olympics
Place of birth missing